The 2017 season was the third season of competitive association football and second season in the Liga 1 (previously named Indonesia Super League) played by Bali United Football Club, a professional football club based in Gianyar, Bali, Indonesia. As the 2015 Indonesia Super League discontinued, it meant it was their second successive season in Liga 1.

In the transfer window, Bali United surprised the public when they successfully signed Irfan Bachdim and Dutch-born naturalized Stefano Lilipaly. They also signed Sylvano Comvalius and Marcos Flores to filled their foreign players quota. Nick van der Velden, the 2008–09 Eredivisie winner with AZ was signed as marquee player. The club kept hold of Ahn Byung-keon as their Asian quota player. Several players were released before the campaign got under way; defender Bobby Satria left to play for Sriwijaya, Rully Desrian joined Bhayangkara while Zoran Knežević, Nemanja Vidaković, and Daniel Heffernan were without a club. Bali United were also left by their first manager, Indra Sjafri who was appointed as Indonesia national under-19 football team head coach. He was replaced by former Persiba head coach, Hans-Peter Schaller.

Bali United began the season in bad form with two defeats in a row which resulted in the dismissal of Hans-Peter Schaller. They slowly bounce back when Widodo Cahyono Putro took charge in May 2017, and even became runner-ups in the first half of the season. They continued their impressive form until the last match and finishing second in the table, same points with eventual winners Bhayangkara but lost in head-to-head results. Thirty one different players represented the club in the league and there were 12 different goalscorers. Bali United's top goalscorer was Sylvano Comvalius, who scored 37 goals in 34 games. Comvalius also broke the record of Peri Sandria who scored 34 goals in single season which lasted for 22 years and became league top scorer.

Background 
The 2016 season was Indra Sjafri's second start to a season as manager of Bali United, having taken charge since the club's founded. They competed in a full season league formatted tournament, Indonesia Soccer Championship A because Indonesia Super League was temporarily-suspended. Bali United completed their first full-season campaign in 12th with 10 wins, 10 draws, 14 loses, and 40 points.

Pre-season and friendlies

Friendlies

Indonesia President's Cup

Trofeo Bali Island Cup

Review and events

April–July 

A trip to the Gelora Ratu Pamelingan Stadium to face Madura United on the opening weekend of the season ended in a 2–0 defeat; the first goals, scored by Bali United's former player Bayu Gatra in the 32nd minute. A handball from Ahn Byung-keon inside the penalty area earn Madura United a penalty, converted by Peter Odemwingie in the 73rd minute. Bali United hosted Persipura a week after. Marinus Wanewar scored after three minutes for the visitors, before Sylvano Comvalius equalized 28 minutes later. But an own goal from Abdul Rahman Sulaiman in the 42nd minute gave Persipura a 2–1 win. That defeat resulted in the dismissal of head coach Hans-Peter Schaller. Eko Purjianto then took charge as caretaker. At the Surajaya Stadium on 30 April, a penalty goal by Marcos Flores earned Bali United a 1–0 win against Persela.

In early May, Flores and Comvalius each scored as Semen Padang were beaten by two goals. Bali United lost their match six days later, away to Mitra Kukar at Aji Imbut Stadium. Comvalius finished off a header to lead for Bali United. Hendra Bayauw and Anindito Wahyu scored and made a comeback for the host to win the match. At the same night in Bali, Bali United introduced their new head coach Widodo Cahyono Putro. In Widodo's first match, Yabes Roni scored twice for Bali United in a 3–0 win against Borneo. The team then played out a goalless draw against Persija, when I Made Wardana successfully thwarting a penalty from Luiz Júnior. Bali United ended May with a 1–0 home win against the defending champions Persib. Flores scored the winning goal in the first half against his former club.

Bali United then faced Perseru on the first weekend of June at their home stadium, but as away team. Comvalius scored an early lead in the 5th minute and then scored again six minutes later. Sílvio Escobar scored for Perseru narrowed the score, but Irfan Bachdim's first goal for Bali United sealed a 3–1 win. They suffered two consecutive defeats: at home to Bhayangkara and away to Arema.

Due to Lebaran, Bali United did not play another game for two weeks. On the resumption of club football, they faced Persiba at home. Goals from Nick van der Velden and Comvalius earned a 2–0 win for the team. Five days later Bali United faced PS TNI at Pakansari Stadium. Bali United began the match the better of the two teams and took the lead after 19 minutes when Bachdim scored. Three minutes later, Comvalius increase the advantage before Élio Martins scored made it 1–2. Bachdim scored his second goal in this match 10 minutes before half time. Erwin Ramdani and Facundo Talín equalized for PS TNI, and the visitors went in front after Fadil Sausu converted a corner kick right into the goal. The final score was 3–4 for Bali United. Bali United recorded the biggest win in their history so far, against Barito Putera at Kapten I Wayan Dipta Stadium. Comvalius scored twice in a 5–0 victory. The fourth match of July was against Sriwijaya at Gelora Sriwijaya Stadium. Comvalius scored to put Bali United in front in the 3rd minute. Sriwijaya replied with two goals from Beto Gonçalves and Yanto Basna, but van der Velden in 64th minute equalized for the away team with a volley. At home to PSM on 23 July, the team earned three points courtesy of Comvalius, Flores, and Miftahul Hamdi. Bali United's next game was away to Persegres Gresik United. An own goal in the first half and two second half goals by Comvalius and Fadil gave Bali United a comfortable win. After 17 games, Bali United accumulated 32 points and lay second in the league table.

August–November 

Bali United lost their first match of August, away to Persipura at Mandala Stadium. Sylvano Comvalius finished off a one-touch move to narrowed the score for Bali United. Bali United faced Madura United at Kapten I Wayan Dipta Stadium. Nick van der Velden opened the scoring for the host after five minutes and Comvalius scored twice made it 3–0. In spite of Fabiano Beltrame's penalty narrowed it to 3–1, Comvalius completed his hat-trick in the 62nd minute from a penalty. I Gede Sukadana scored the fifth goal for the home team before Bayu Gatra made it 5–2. As the match against Persela was postponed due to Indonesian Independence Day week, Bali United traveled to Semen Padang on 24 August and claimed a 3–1 victory. Bali United recorded the second five-goal margin win this season, against Mitra Kukar at Kapten I Wayan Dipta Stadium. Comvalius scored a quin-trick in a 6–1 victory.

On 3 September, Comvalius scored two goals in Bali United's 5–1 win against Persela in the postponed match. Bali United played out a goalless draw with Borneo on 11 September. Four days later, they faced Persija, where Comvalius and Irfan Bachdim sealed a 2–1 victory. The team then played out a goalless draw against Persib. Goals from Bachdim and midfielder Marcos Flores against Perseru, gave the team an eighth straight unbeaten in the league. At Patriot Chandrabhaga Stadium, Bali United lost 3–2 to the league leaders Bhayangkara; midfielder Paulo Sérgio scored twice and an own goal from I Made Andhika Wijaya widening the gap between two teams.

Bali United again recorded their most goals scored, against Arema at Kapten I Wayan Dipta Stadium. An inspired performance by Stefano Lilipaly helped the team win 6–1; created his first and second goals for the team in the second half. Eight days later, Bali United conceding two in the final four minutes to throw away a 2–1 lead against Persiba. Bali United's form improved as the season drew to a close. At home to PS TNI on 20 October, the team earned three points courtesy of Comvalius' brace. Comvalius scored the goal in Bali United's match against Barito Putera to save the team from losing and the team moved back to first position with a home win against Sriwijaya – Comvalius scored another brace.

Bali United defeated PSM 1–0 on 6 November in a horror ending as the home supporter went riot after the match. The win made closer to win the title. But the decision from PSSI disciplinary committee to awarded a 3–0 win for Bhayangkara due to Mitra Kukar played an illegal player during the match between the two, made Bali United's chance to win their first major title disappear. Even though Bhayangkara lost their last match against Persija and Bali United won against Persegres Gresik United, Bali United lost the head-to-head results with Bhayangkara.

Match results

Liga 1

Player details

Appearances and goals 

|- class="sortbottom"
! colspan="14"| Players transferred out during the season
|-

Disciplinary record

Transfers

Transfers in

Transfers out

Loans out

Awards 
 Liga 1
 Top Goalscorer: Sylvano Comvalius (37 goals)
 Best XI: Sylvano Comvalius, Irfan Bachdim

References 

Bali United F.C. seasons
Bali United